Silicon Image is a provider of semiconductors for the mobile, consumer electronics and personal computers (PCs). It also manufactures wireless and wired connectivity products used for high-definition content. The company’s semiconductor and IP products are deployed by the electronics manufacturers in devices such as smartphones, tablets, digital televisions (DTVs), other consumer electronics, as well as desktop and notebook PCs. Silicon Image, in cooperation with other companies, has driven the creation of some global industry standards such as DVI, HDMI, MHL, and WirelessHD.

Silicon Image was founded in 1995, and was headquartered in Sunnyvale, California, employs around 600 people worldwide and has regional engineering and sales offices in India, China, Japan, Korea and Taiwan.

History 
The company was founded in 1995 by Silicon Valley engineers Dr. David Lee and Brian Underwood. In October 1999 it raised $46.8 million in initial public offering
 March 2000: Silicon Image Inc. agreed to buy the closely held DVDO Inc. for $45 million in stock to add technology for digital televisions, DVD players and high-definition video.
 June 2001: acquired CMD Technology Inc., a provider of SCSI and Fibre Channel storage controllers for the UNIX, Open Systems and PC markets as well as a supplier of IDE/Ultra ATA semiconductors (including CMD064x chips) for the PC and embedded markets. 
 January 2007: Silicon Image completes acquisition of Sci-worx GmbH
 June 2007: Silicon Image shipped its 1 millionth DTV input processor
 January 2009: Silicon Image wins Emmy Award for HDMI technology

 December 2010: Silicon Image introduces ViaPort technology
 February 2011: Silicon Image completes acquisition of Anchor Bay Technologies
 May 2011: Silicon Image completes acquisition of SiBEAM, Inc.
 May 2011: Silicon Image unveils third-generation WirelessHD 60 GHz chipsets
 August 2013: MHL Consortium announces new specification with major advancements for mobile and consumer electronics connectivity
 September 2013: Silicon Image announces first 4K UltraHD MHL 3.0 receiver IC with HDCP 2.2 in support of secure premium content
 March 2015: Silicon Image is acquired by Lattice Semiconductor for $600 million.

Products
The company sells semiconductor hardware and intellectual property (IP) products. Silicon Image's products are deployed by electronics manufacturers in consumer devices like PCs, mobile phones, tablets and digital cameras.

The company is involved in industry standards such as HDMI, DVI, Serial Port Memory Technology (SPMT), Mobile High-definition Link (MHL), and the standard for  wireless HD video - WirelessHD (WiHD).

See also 
 Digital Visual Interface (DVI)
 High-Definition Multimedia Interface (HDMI)
 Mobile High-definition Link (MHL)
 Transition Minimized Differential Signaling (TMDS)

References

External links 

 

Companies based in Sunnyvale, California
Fabless semiconductor companies
Semiconductor companies of the United States
Companies established in 1995
Companies formerly listed on the Nasdaq
1995 establishments in the United States
1999 initial public offerings
2015 mergers and acquisitions